FCT may refer to:

Mathematics
 Flux-corrected transport
 Fast cosine transform
 International Symposium on Fundamentals of Computation Theory

Places 
 Australian Capital Territory, formerly the Federal Capital Territory
 Claremont railway station, Perth, in Western Australia
 Federal Capital Territory (Nigeria)
 Federal Capital Territory (Pakistan), around Karachi, now defunct
 Fort Canning Tunnel, in Singapore

Sport 
 FC Trollhättan, a Swedish football club
 FC Twente, a Dutch football club
 Feminine Cycling Team, a German cycling team

Other uses 
 2001 Sino-Russian Treaty of Friendship
 Faculdade de Ciências e Tecnologia (disambiguation)
 Fellow of the Association of Corporate Treasurers, a professional organisation
 Florida Communities Trust
 Fundação para a Ciência e Tecnologia, the main funding agency for scientific research in Portugal
 Functional testing
 Fukushima Central Television, a Japanese television company